Barry Stewart (6 May 1940 – 23 July 1975) was an Australian cricketer. He played one first-class match for Tasmania in 1968/69.

See also
 List of Tasmanian representative cricketers

References

External links
 

1940 births
1975 deaths
Australian cricketers
Tasmania cricketers
Cricketers from Tasmania